This is a list of United States ambassadors to Bosnia and Herzegovina.

The United States recognized the independence of Bosnia and Herzegovina on April 7, 1992, and announced the establishment of diplomatic relations on August 6, 1992. A U.S. Embassy was established on November 10, 1993, on the premises of the Vienna embassy. The embassy in Sarajevo was established on July 4, 1994.

List

See also
Embassy of the United States, Sarajevo
Bosnia and Herzegovina–United States relations
Foreign relations of Bosnia and Herzegovina
Ambassadors of the United States

References
United States Department of State: Background notes on Bosnia and Herzegovina

External links
United States Department of State: Chiefs of Mission for Bosnia and Herzegovina
United States Department of State: Bosnia and Herzegovina
United States Embassy in Sarajevo

Bosnia and Herzegovina
Main
United States